The Soviet Paradise (German original title "Das Sowjet-Paradies") was the name of an exhibition and a propaganda film created by the Department of Film of the propaganda organisation (Reichspropagandaleitung) of the German Nazi Party (NSDAP), and was displayed in the larger cities of the Reich and occupied countries: Vienna, Prague, Berlin and others. Its goal was to show "poverty, misery, depravity and need" of the nations in the Soviet Union under  "Jewish Bolshevist" rule and thus to justify the war against the Soviet Union. The accompanying guide for the exhibition noted, "The present Soviet state is nothing other than the realization of that Jewish invention".

The exhibition included entire households with its contents, transported from the Eastern Front, on display. The exhibition contained images of firing-squads and bodies of young girls, some still children, who had been hung and were dangling from ropes.

From 8 May to 21 June 1942, the exhibition was in the Lustgarten in Berlin and according to official information 1.3 million people visited the show. On May 18 a Jewish-Communist resistance group called "Baum-Group" organized an arson attack, which killed five of those in attendance. Herbert Baum, Marianne Baum, and over 30 other people were arrested and executed. A short propaganda film was created to supplement the exhibition.

External links 
 A partial English translation of a brochure from the exhibit
Details of the Prague Soviet Paradise exhibition

References

Nazi works
1942 films
Anti-communism in Germany
Nazi propaganda